Asgiriwalpola is a small village in Minuwangoda Divisional Secretariat of Gampaha District, Western Province, Sri Lanka.

See also
Udugampola

References

Populated places in Gampaha District